TORU (rus. Телеоператорный Режим Управления - Teleoperated Mode of (spacecraft) Control ) system is a manual docking system of Russian Soyuz and Progress spacecraft that serves as a backup to the automatic Kurs system. It was used on the former Mir space station and is currently in use on the International Space Station. The TORU system became known to the public in 1997 when it was used during the manual approach of Progress M-34 to Mir that ended up with a dangerous collision. It was an approach of a previously used Progress spacecraft with the purpose of research work on further improvement of TORU.

TORU has two joysticks which can be used to manually fly the ship. The left joystick is used to control the movement of the ship (translation) and the right joystick is used to control its orientation (rotation). The system also includes a camera mounted on the docking spacecraft and provides visual feedback when the spacecraft is remotely controlled from the station to which it is docking. TORU also transfers sounds from the spacecraft that may provide indirect information about the docking process.

While ships are sufficiently close when docking to make signal travel delay insignificant, cosmonauts claim that TORU has a certain delay when operating the ship from the space station remotely. Some radio amateurs think they have observed TORU docking signals.

TORU was first tested in 1993 (Progress M-15) and actually used next year to dock Progress M-24 (after two unsuccessful attempts to dock automatically). Despite the 1997 year collision, it was used same year again to dock the next Progress spacecraft, Progress M-35, after Mir board computer failed. TORU was also used in many later missions (Progress M-53, Progress M-67, Progress M1-4 and possibly others).

References

Space program of Russia
Spacecraft docking systems
Mir